Egibacter rhizosphaeraea  is a Gram-positive, obligately halophilic, facultatively alkaliphilic, non-spore-forming, and non-motile bacterium from the genus Egibacter which has been isolated from the rhizosphere of the plant Tamarix hispida in Xinjiang in China.

References

External links
Type strain of Egibacter rhizosphaerae at BacDive -  the Bacterial Diversity Metadatabase

 

Actinomycetota
Bacteria described in 2016